Carolyn F. Wilkins  (born 1945) is an Australian botanist, who currently (April 2020) works for the Western Australian Department of Biodiversity, Conservation and Attractions.

She (together with others) has revised the genera, Jacksonia and Guichenotia,  and much of her work has been on the Malvaceae and on the Mirbelieae.

She has published 103 names.

The standard author abbreviation C.F.Wilkins is used to indicate this person as the author when citing a botanical name.

References 

1945 births
Living people
20th-century Australian botanists

Western Australia
Malvaceae
21st-century Australian botanists
20th-century Australian women scientists